Live at Clark University is a posthumous live album by the Jimi Hendrix Experience, released on July 6, 1999, by Dagger Records. The album documents the band's performance at Clark University in Worcester, Massachusetts on March 15, 1968. "Fire", "Red House" and "Foxey Lady", as well as the two interviews with Jimi Hendrix, were featured on the companion CD to the book Jimi Hendrix: An Illustrated Experience (2007). The album was re-released - minus the interviews - on vinyl in 2010 as part of Record Store Day.

The concert
The performance at the university was part of the band's extensive American tour in support of Axis: Bold As Love. The Experience played in the Atwood Hall, which could accommodate more than six hundred students. Tickets for the concerts, which sold out, were modestly priced, with seats priced at $3.00, $3.50, and $4.00. Hendrix was interviewed before his band's set, a recording of which is featured on the album. The album opens with "Fire", though it is unknown if other tracks preceded it. The show was professionally recorded, and post-concert interviews with bassist Noel Redding, drummer Mitch Mitchell and Hendrix are also included.

The photograph on the album cover was taken by Robert Marshall, who was the staff photographer for the Clark Scarlet, the Clark University student newspaper.

Track listing
All songs were written by Jimi Hendrix, except where noted.

Personnel
 Jimi Hendrixguitar, lead vocals
 Mitch Mitchelldrums
 Noel Reddingbass guitar, backing vocals

References

Live albums published posthumously
Clark University
Jimi Hendrix live albums
1999 live albums
Dagger Records live albums